Judith Buber Agassi (17 June 1924 – 15 July 2018) was a German-born Israeli sociologist, who wrote about women, work and the experience of those imprisoned in Ravensbrück concentration camp. She also edited the work of her mother Margarete Buber-Neumann and her grandfather Martin Buber.

Life
Judith Buber was born in Heppenheim, Germany on 17 June 1924, at the house of her grandparents, Paula and Martin Buber. Her parents, Rafael Buber and his first wife, Margarete, lived there for a year, along with Judith's older sister Barbara. After the couple divorced, Rafael was awarded custody and the girls were raised at their grandparents' home in Heppenheim. She migrated to Jerusalem in March 1938. 

She was educated at Beth Hakerem High School and the Hebrew University of Jerusalem, graduating in 1951 with an MA in History. In 1949 she married the philosopher Joseph Agassi. She earned her doctorate at the London School of Economics in 1960, with a thesis on local government and parliamentary democracy.

Margarete Buber-Neumann spent four years as a political prisoner in Ravensbrück concentration camp. Judith Buber Agassi spent years interviewing women who had survived the camp, and recovered the identities of over 16,000 prisoners.

Works
 Mass media in Indonesia, 1969
 The characteristics of typical women's jobs and the attitudes of women to those jobs: a comparative multinational study, 1978
 Women on the job: the attitudes of women to their work, 1979
 Comparing the work attitudes of women and men, 1982
 The Redesign of working time: promise or threat?, 1989
 (ed.) Plädoyer für Freiheit und Menschlichkeit: Vorträge aus 35 Jahren by Margarete Buber-Neumann, 1999
 (ed.) Martin Buber on psychology and psychotherapy: essays, letters, and dialogue by Martin Buber, 1999
 The Jewish women prisoners of Ravensbrück: who were they?, 2006
 (ed.) Schriften zur Psychologie und Psychotherapie by Martin Buber, 2008
 The Jewish women prisoners of Ravensbruck: who were they?, 2012

References

1924 births
2018 deaths
Israeli sociologists
Israeli women sociologists
Jewish emigrants from Nazi Germany to Mandatory Palestine
People from Bergstraße (district)